Aleksandr Vasilyevich Novikov (born October 31, 1953, in Iturup) is a Soviet and Russian author and performer of songs in the genre of Russian chanson, artistic director of the Yekaterinburg Variety Theatre.

During the creative activity of Aleksandr Novikov wrote over three hundred songs.

His discography currently consists of 20 numbered albums, 10 albums with recordings of concerts, 8 DVDs. Since 2002 published book Kolokolnya (a collection of poems and songs).

Novikov is the winner of the national award Ovation in the nomination  Urban Romance (1995), repeated winner of the  Chanson of the Year.

References

External links
 Official Site
 Biography on the site Radio Chanson
 Poetry Aleksandr Novikov

Russian chanson
1953 births
Soviet male singers
Soviet singer-songwriters
Russian male singer-songwriters
Living people
People from Sakhalin Oblast
Soviet male composers
Russian male composers
Russian guitarists
20th-century Russian male singers
20th-century Russian singers
Russian male guitarists